Melolobium is a genus of 15 species of flowering plants belonging to the family Fabaceae. It is native to southern Africa, where it is found in south and east Namibia, southwest Botswana, and most of South Africa.

These plants are perennial herbs and small shrubs. Many are spiny. The leaves have three leaflets. The inflorescence is a terminal raceme of flowers. The flowers are yellow, sometimes fading orange or purple.

Species
Melolobium comprises the following species:
 Melolobium accedens Burtt Davy
 Melolobium adenodes Eckl. & Zeyh.
 Melolobium aethiopicum (L.) Druce
 Melolobium alpinum Eckl. & Zeyh.

 Melolobium burchellii N.E. Br.
 Melolobium calycinum Benth.
 Melolobium canaliculatum (E. Mey.) Benth.
 Melolobium candicans (E. Mey.) Eckl. & Zeyh.
 Melolobium canescens (E. Mey.) Benth.

 Melolobium decorum Dummer
 Melolobium decumbens (E. Mey.) Burtt Davy
 Melolobium exudans Harv.
 Melolobium glanduliferum Dummer
 Melolobium humile Eckl. & Zeyh.

 Melolobium karasbergense L. Bolus
 Melolobium macrocalyx Dummer
 Melolobium microphyllum (L. f.) Eckl. & Zeyh.
 Melolobium mixtum Dummer
 Melolobium obcordatum Harv.
 Melolobium parviflorum Benth.
 Melolobium peglerae Dummer

 Melolobium stipulatum (Thunb.) Harv.
 Melolobium subspicatum Conrath
 Melolobium velutinum E. Mey.
 Melolobium villosum Harms
 Melolobium viscidulum Steud.
 Melolobium wilmsii Harms

Species names with uncertain taxonomic status
The status of the following species is unresolved:
 Melolobium collinum Eckl. & Zeyh.
 Melolobium lampolobum (E.Mey.) Moteetee & B.-E.van Wyk
 Melolobium macrocalyx Dümmer
 Melolobium spicatum Eckl. & Zeyh.
 Melolobium squarrosum Eckl. & Zeyh.

References

Genisteae
Fabaceae genera
Taxonomy articles created by Polbot